The Applied Information Science in Economics (Прикладная информатика в Экономике) or Applied Computer Science in Economics is a professional qualification generally awarded in Russian Federation. The degree inherited from the U.S.S.R. education system also known as Specialist degree. The degree is awarded after five years of full-time study and includes several internships, course-works, thesis writing and defense.

The degree has similarities with German Magister Artium or Diplom degree. However, due to the Bologna Process number of such degrees are declining.

Degree focuses on applying mathematical methods in economics involving maximum information technology. It is very close to applied mathematics, but includes also major part of computer science.

List of specialty codes in the education system 

080801 - Applied computer science in economics
351400 - Applied computer science

Fields of activity 

Organization and management;
Project design;
Experimental research;
Marketing;
Consulting;
Operational and Maintenance.

Major 

Information Science and Programming.
High Level Methods of Information Science and Programming.
Information Technologies in Economics.
Computer Systems, Networks and Telecommunications Services.
Operational Environments, Systems and Shells.
Architecture and Design of Information Systems for Companies.
Data Bases.
Information security.
Information Management.
Imitative Simulation.

See also 

Specialist degree
Academic degree
Master's degree
Education in Russia
Information science
Computer science

References 

Information science
Economics education
Academic degrees